Gennadi Zaichik (born 11 February 1957) is a Georgian chess and American (from 2002) Grandmaster (GM) (1984), two-times Georgian Chess Championship winner (1977, 1978).

Biography
Gennadi Zaichik began to achieve his first significant successes in the early 1980s. In 1982 in Telavi he shared the 2nd place with Georgy Agzamov (behind Rafael Vaganian) in the Soviet Chess Championship First League. A year later in the Jūrmala Gennadi Zaichik ranked 3rd in Soviet Junior Chess Championship in U26 age group and also he won the international chess tournament in Kecskemét. In 1984 he won Rubinstein Memorial in Polanica-Zdrój. In 1984, Gennadi Zaichik was awarded the FIDE Grandmaster (GM) title.

In 1985, in Prague he ranked 2nd place in International chess tournament Bohemians. In 1987 Gennadi Zaichik won Capablanca Memorial B tournament in Camagüey and shared 1st place with Viswanathan Anand) in Coimbatore. In 1989, he shared 2nd place in Berlin, and in 1991 he shared 1st place in Open chess tournament in San Sebastián.

Gennadi Zaichik played for Georgia in the Chess Olympiads:
 In 1992, at first reserve board in the 30th Chess Olympiad in Manila (+4, =1, -1),
 In 1994, at first reserve board in the 31st Chess Olympiad in Moscow (+6, =3, -1),
 In 1996, at fourth board in the 32nd Chess Olympiad in Yerevan (+3, =5, -2).

Since 2002, Gennadi Zaichik has moved to the United States. In 2002, he shared 1st place with Evgeniy Najer in U.S. Open Chess Championship and won Richard Aronow memorial in Philadelphia.

In recent years Gennadi Zaichik has rarely participated in chess tournaments.

References

External links

Gennadi Zaichik chess games at 365Chess.com

1957 births
Living people
Sportspeople from Tbilisi
American chess players
Chess players from Georgia (country)
Soviet chess players
Chess grandmasters